The 1984 Australian Touring Car season was the 25th season of touring car racing in Australia commencing from 1960 when the first Australian Touring Car Championship and the first Armstrong 500 (the forerunner of the present day Bathurst 1000) were contested. It was the last season in for the locally developed Group C category before the move to the FIA's Group A rules from 1985.

Touring Cars competed at 17 race meetings in Australia during the 1984 season, contesting the following events:
 The seven rounds of the 1984 Australian Touring Car Championship (ATCC)
 The five rounds of the 1984 Australian Endurance Championship
 The four rounds of the 1984 AMSCAR series, held exclusively at Amaroo Park (each round consisted of 3 races).
 A touring car support round at the 1984 Australian Grand Prix meeting held at Calder Park. This was the last Australian Grand Prix held before the race became a part of the Formula One World Championship from 1985.

Race calendar

Australian Touring Car Championship

Australian Endurance Championship

Castrol 500

James Hardie 1000

AMSCAR Series

Australian Grand Prix support race 
This race was a support event at the 1984 Australian Grand Prix meeting. The race was open to both Group C and the new Group A touring cars and was won for the second year running by Nissan driver George Fury driving his Bluebird Turbo. For the second year in a row Peter Brock finished second in his HDT Commodore (his only loss in 4 races in the #05 Group C VK), with Warren Cullen third in his K-Mart sponsored Commodore. In a sign of things to come in 1985, Jim Richards was the winner of the Group A class in his JPS Team BMW 635 CSi.

This was the last ever competitive touring car race on the Australian mainland for the locally developed Group C cars. In late 1984 there was a race held for the Group C cars at the Baskerville Raceway in Tasmania where reportedly only six cars were in attendance. The Baskerville race was won by Allan Grice in his Roadways Racing VK Commodore.

References

Linked articles contain additional references.

External links
 Official V8 Supercar site

Australian Touring Car Championship
Touring Cars